Jarinporn Joonkiat (born 29 January 1990), nicknamed Toey (เต้ย) is a Thai actress, model, and host. She is currently signed under Channel 3. She is best known for her roles in  Dear Galileo (2009), Countdown (2012), Timeline (2014), Kleun Cheewit (2017), and Toong Sanaeha (2020).

Early life and education
Joonkiat was born on January 29, 1990. She graduated from Srinakharinwirot University with a bachelor's degree in Fine Arts. She earned a master's degree from Mahidol University. She has a younger brother, Achira Junkiat (Ik), who was diagnosed with leukemia.

Career 
Jarinporn became well known through the contest “Utip Freshy Idol 2007”. She was also one of the female MCs of “Sister Day” on Channel 5, making her famous as a teen idol.

Personal life 
Jarinporn used to be in a relationship with Alexander Rendell. They remind good friend and business partner. In mid 2020, news reported that Teeradetch Metawarayut and her broke up after 3 years of dating.

Filmography

Film

Dramas

Music video appearances

Discography

Concerts

Awards and nominations

References

External links
 
  

1990 births
Living people
Jarinporn Joonkiat
Jarinporn Joonkiat
Jarinporn Joonkiat
Jarinporn Joonkiat
Jarinporn Joonkiat
Jarinporn Joonkiat